Joseph Hugh Shennan  (13 March 1933 – 25 May 2015) was a British historian who was Professor of European Studies (1974–98) and Deputy Vice-Chancellor (1993–98) at the University of Lancaster. One of the pioneers in European Studies, his research focussed primarily on the history of France during the Ancien Régime as well as on the history of early modern Europe.

Life 
Shennan was born in 1933 to primary school teachers Hugh and Mary Shennan. He studied History at the University of Liverpool where he received a Bachelor of Arts degree in 1955. From 1955 to 1957 he did his National Service. In 1957, he continued his studies at Corpus Christi College, Cambridge where he received his doctorate in 1960. He taught as Assistant Lecturer and later as Lecturer in History at the University of Liverpool.

From 1965, he was employed at the University of Lancaster and played an important role in the establishment of the History Department. Over the years he taught as a Senior Lecturer and Reader. In the 1970s he was one of the pioneers of European Studies. In 1971, he and like-minded people founded the journal European Studies Review which he served as editor until 1979. The journal later became the European History Quarterly.

In 1974, he was appointed Professor of European Studies. As such, he worked on building Lancaster's interdisciplinary School of European Studies and was its first director. From 1979 to 1984, he was Head of the History Department. During this time, he founded the Lancaster Pamphlets, edited by the History Department, to which he also contributed three titles, France before the Revolution (1983), Louis XIV (1986) and International Relations in Europe, 1689–1789 (1995). In 1985, he was appointed provisional Chancellor and in 1993 he was appointed Deputy Vice-Chancellor of the university. In 1998, he retired.

Publications

References 

1933 births
2015 deaths
Academic journal editors
Alumni of the University of Liverpool
Alumni of Corpus Christi College, Cambridge
20th-century British historians
21st-century British historians
Academics of the University of Liverpool
Academics of Lancaster University
Fellows of the Royal Historical Society
Historians of France
Historians of Europe
Writers from Liverpool